Ratthasart Korrasud ( born January 1, 1976) is recognized from both IT Management for various companies and formal Thai pop singer and actor GMM Grammy who released his debut in 1994 with the boyband U.H.T. (ยูเอชที). He is also sometimes known as Pepper UHT. Currently active as an IT/ digital media expert, he has worked in this field for many years and teaches IT for many universities.  Currently, he is head of eCommerce Development of Electronic Transactions Development Agency, Ministry of Information and Communication Technology (ICT), Royal Thai Government.  Previously he was Vice President of Sanook Online (now Tencent (Thailand)), the operator of Thailand's number one web portal and Country Manager of LINE Corporation (Thailand.)

Biography
Pepper was born in Bangkok in 1976. He is of Thai, Chinese, and German descent. In 1994, he debuted his career as a member of the inaugural famous Thai boyband U.H.T. (ยูเอชที).
He received his bachelor's degree in Public Administration from the Faculty of Political Science, Thammasat University. 
From 2000 to 2002, he studied in Chicago, Illinois in the United States for a Master of Information System – Software Engineering where he graduated with honors.
Soon after, he returned to his home country to complete a doctoral degree in Branch Board of Education Curriculum and Instruction (C&I) from Kasetsart University in 2011.

Discography

Work Experiences
2018 SENIOR EXECUTIVE VICE PRESIDENT/ COO, DIGITAL ECONOMY PROMOTION AGENCY (DEPA),MDES
2015 SENIOR DIRECTOR, ELECTRONIC TRANSACTIONS DEVELOPMENT AGENCY (ETDA), MDES
2014 Country Manager/ CEO – LINE Corporation (Thailand)
2011 Vice President – Sanook Online Co.Ltd. (Tencent Technology)
2001 Consultant – Holcim Services (ASIA) Co., Ltd.

Albums with U.H.T.
 1994 – Good good friends / ดูดีดีนะเพื่อน
 1996 – Summertimes / ซัมเมอร์ ไทม์
 2003 – 2U / ทูยู
 2004 – Red Message / เรด เมสเสจ

Special Albums
Group albums with U.H.T., Tata Young, Christina Aguilar, Patiparn Pataweekarn, Myria Benedetti and Jetrin Wattanasin
 1995 – 6.2.12
 2013 – 6.2.13

Filmography

Television
 2004 – Leh Ratree / เล่ห์รตี with 
 2004 – Wung Num Won / วังน้ำวน with 
 2005 – Buang Ruk / บ่วงรัก with Fang Pitchaya
 2005 – Rak Lhok Lhok Yah Boke Krai / รักหลอกๆ อย่าบอกใคร with Sopitnapa Chumpanee
 2006 – Lord Lai Mungkorn / ลอดลายมังกร with Pimolrat Pisolyabutr
 2007 – Maya Pissaward / มายาพิศวาส with Ann Alicha Laisattruklai
 2007 – Sao Ban Rai Grub Nai Hi-So / สาวบ้านไร่กับนายไฮโซ with Ann Alicha Laisattruklai
 2008 – Sapai Khon Krua / สะใภ้ก้นครัว with Amy Amika Klinprathum
 2009 – Ching Chang / ชิงชัง with Ann Alicha Laisattruklai
 2010 – Rong Raem Pee / โรงแรมผี with Chakrit Yamnam
 2010 – Sao Chai Hi-Tech / สาวใช้ไฮเทค with Amy Amika Klinprathum
 2011 – Talad Arom / ตลาดอารมณ์ with Airin Yoogthatat

Master of Ceremony: MC ON TV

References

1976 births
Living people
Ratthasart Korrasud
Ratthasart Korrasud
Ratthasart Korrasud
Ratthasart Korrasud
Ratthasart Korrasud
Ratthasart Korrasud
Ratthasart Korrasud
Ratthasart Korrasud